Damascus is a town in Faulkner and Van Buren counties of central Arkansas, United States.  The population of Damascus was 382 at the 2010 census.

History
Damascus is a town located in the Ozark foothills on a plateau surrounded by clear streams along U.S. Highway 65 on the county line between Faulkner and Van Buren counties. It is most known for its proximity to the Titan II missile base that operated from 1963 until 1980, when a missile explosion killed one person and injured twenty-one.  Damascus is home to three Baptist churches, a Church of Christ that was built in 1917, and a Methodist church that was built in 1947. Though the Methodist congregation is no longer active, the Damascus Methodist Church Cemetery remains north of the town.

Damascus is also near the Gus Blass Scout Reservation, a Boy Scout Camp of 3,000 acres maintained by the Quapaw Area Council.

Broken Arrow Incident

Construction began on a Titan II missile base north of Damascus in 1961; the site became active on December 18, 1963. During routine maintenance in a Titan II silo, an Air Force repairman dropped a heavy wrench socket, which rolled off a work platform and fell toward the bottom of the silo. The socket bounced and struck the missile, causing a leak from a pressurized fuel tank. The missile complex and the surrounding area were evacuated and a team of specialists was called in from Little Rock Air Force Base, the missile's main support base. About 8 1/2 hours after the initial puncture, fuel vapors within the silo ignited and exploded. The explosion fatally injured one member of the team. Twenty-one other USAR personnel were injured. The missile's re-entry vehicle, which contained a nuclear warhead, was recovered intact. There was no radioactive contamination.

Damascus was the site of a nuclear "Broken Arrow" incident on September 18–19, 1980 when a Titan II ICBM exploded 3.3 miles (5.3 km) NNE of the town, although no radiation was spread as a result of the explosion.

Geography
Damascus is located at  (35.3673020, -92.4096005). According to the United States Census Bureau, the town has a total area of 5.0 km (1.9 mi²), all land.

Demographics

Damascus's portion within Faulkner County is in the northernmost part of the Little Rock–North Little Rock–Conway Metropolitan Statistical Area.

At the 2000 census there were 306 people, 137 households, and 90 families in the town.  The population density was 61.2/km (158.3/mi²).  There were 157 housing units at an average density of 31.4/km (81.2/mi²).  The racial makeup of the town was 97.71% White, 0.98% Black or African American, 0.33% Native American, and 0.98% from two or more races.  1.31% of the population were Hispanic or Latino of any race. Of the 137 households 26.3% had children under the age of 18 living with them, 53.3% were married couples living together, 7.3% had a female householder with no husband present, and 34.3% were non-families. 30.7% of households were one person and 19.0% were one person aged 65 or older.  The average household size was 2.23 and the average family size was 2.81.

The age distribution was 21.2% under the age of 18, 5.9% from 18 to 24, 25.2% from 25 to 44, 21.9% from 45 to 64, and 25.8% 65 or older.  The median age was 44 years. For every 100 females, there were 96.2 males.  For every 100 females age 18 and over, there were 88.3 males.

The median household income was $28,977 and the median family income  was $38,750. Males had a median income of $28,214 versus $16,458 for females. The per capita income for the town was $18,342.  About 1.3% of families and 8.0% of the population were below the poverty line, including none of those under the age of eighteen and 22.2% of those sixty five or over.

Education
Public education for elementary and secondary school students in all parts of Damascus is available from the South Side School District.

Libraries 
The city is served by the Faulkner-Van Buren Regional Library System, a two county library system formed in 1954. Damascus Library

Notable person
 Kim Hammer, Republican member of the Arkansas House of Representatives from District 28 since 2011; raised in Damascus, after being born in Rockford, Illinois

References

Further reading
https://encyclopediaofarkansas.net/entries/damascus-van-buren-and-faulkner-counties-7120/

Cities in Arkansas
Cities in Van Buren County, Arkansas
Cities in Faulkner County, Arkansas
Cities in Little Rock–North Little Rock–Conway metropolitan area